The Broken Group is a group of small islands and islets in the middle of Barkley Sound on the West Coast of Vancouver Island, British Columbia, Canada.  The group is protected as the Broken Islands Group Unit of the Pacific Rim National Park Reserve, which includes Long Beach, between Ucluelet and Tofino to Barkley Sound's northwest, and the West Coast Trail between Port Renfrew and Bamfield, which is to the southeast.  The group lies between Imperial Eagle and Loudon Channels and includes Brabant Islands, Hand Island, but not Pinkerton Islands. The southernmost of the group is Cree Island, the easternmost is Reeks Island. Benson Island, on the northwest corner of the Broken Group, is an important cultural site for the Tseshaht First Nation.

References

External links

Islands of British Columbia
Barkley Sound region